The men's discus throw event at the 2020 Summer Olympics took place between 30 and 31 July 2021 at the Japan National Stadium. Approximately 35 athletes were expected to compete; the exact number depended on how many nations use universality places to enter athletes in addition to the 32 qualifying through distance or ranking (no universality places were used in 2016). 32 athletes from 24 nations competed. Daniel Ståhl of Sweden won gold, with his countryman Simon Pettersson earning silver. It was the first victory in the event for Sweden and the first men's discus throw medal of any color for the nation since 1972. Lukas Weißhaidinger took Austria's first-ever Olympic in the men's discus with his bronze.

Summary
Matthew Denny took the early lead with a 65.76 metres in the first round. After almost fouling out of the qualifying round Lukas Weißhaidinger started the second round with a 66.65 metres to take the lead. Shortly afterward, Simon Pettersson almost matched it with a 66.58 metres of his own. The next thrower was his Swedish teammate Daniel Ståhl who launched the winner . It turned out to be his only throw of the day good enough to win. In the third, Weißhaidinger would improve to his best of the day 67.07 metres but that couldn't withstand Pettersson's fifth round best of 67.39 metres. Denny would throw a personal best 67.02 metres in the final round, but not enough to get on the medal stand. Not only was it Sweden's first 1–2 finish in the discus, they were the only Swedish medals in the event other than Ricky Bruch's 1972 bronze.

Background

This was the 29th appearance of the event, making it one of 12 athletics events to have been held at every Summer Olympics.

Qualification

A National Olympic Committee (NOC) could enter up to 3 qualified athletes in the men's discus throw event if all athletes meet the entry standard or qualify by ranking during the qualifying period. (The limit of 3 has been in place since the 1930 Olympic Congress.) The qualifying standard is 66.00 metres. This standard was "set for the sole purpose of qualifying athletes with exceptional performances unable to qualify through the IAAF World Rankings pathway." The world rankings, based on the average of the best five results for the athlete over the qualifying period and weighted by the importance of the meet, will then be used to qualify athletes until the cap of 32 is reached.

The qualifying period was originally from 1 May 2019 to 29 June 2020. Due to the COVID-19 pandemic, the period was suspended from 6 April 2020 to 30 November 2020, with the end date extended to 29 June 2021. The world rankings period start date was also changed from 1 May 2019 to 30 June 2020; athletes who had met the qualifying standard during that time were still qualified, but those using world rankings would not be able to count performances during that time. The qualifying time standards could be obtained in various meets during the given period that have the approval of the IAAF. Both outdoor and indoor meets are eligible. The most recent Area Championships may be counted in the ranking, even if not during the qualifying period.

NOCs can also use their universality place—each NOC can enter one male athlete regardless of time if they had no male athletes meeting the entry standard for an athletics event—in the discus throw.

Entry number: 32.

Competition format

The 2020 competition will continue to use the two-round format with divided final introduced in 1936. The qualifying round gives each competitor three throws to achieve a qualifying distance (not yet set; 2016 used 65.50 metres); if fewer than 12 men do so, the top 12 will advance. The final provides each thrower with three throws; the top eight throwers receive an additional three throws for a total of six, with the best to count (qualifying round throws are not considered for the final).

Records

Prior to this competition, the existing world, Olympic, and area records are as follows.

No new records were established during the competition.

Schedule

All times are Japan Standard Time (UTC+9)

The men's discus throw will take place over two separate days.

Results

Qualifying 
Qualification Rules: Qualifying performance 66.00 (Q) or at least 12 best performers (q) advance to the Final.

Final

References

Men's discus throw
2020
Men's events at the 2020 Summer Olympics